Aroa Nicole Gorostiza Ulloa (born 7 May 1999) is a Spanish professional racing cyclist, who most recently rode for UCI Women's Continental Team .

References

External links

1999 births
Living people
Spanish female cyclists
Place of birth missing (living people)
People from Durangaldea
Sportspeople from Biscay
Cyclists from the Basque Country (autonomous community)
21st-century Spanish women